Highway 764 is a highway in the Canadian province of Saskatchewan. It runs from Highway 219 to Highway 397 / Highway 763 near Allan. Highway 764 is about 83 km (52 mi.) long.

Highway 764 heads eastward from Highway 219 as the Hanley Grid. Access roads to the town of Hanley are about 26 km from Highway 219, and Highway 764 intersects Highway 11 2 km later. At Range Road 3013, Highway 764 shifts northward over the Allan Hills, and through the community of Allan Hills. Highway 764 ends at a three-way junction of Highways 397, 763, and 764. All three highways end at this intersection.

See also 
Roads in Saskatchewan
Transportation in Saskatchewan

References 

764